So Far may refer to:

Literature
 So Far..., a 1995 autobiography by Kelsey Grammer

Film and video
 Grateful Dead: So Far, a 1987 music documentary about the Grateful Dead
 So Far, a 2005 music documentary about Section 25

Music

Albums
 ...So Far, a 1999 album by D. D. Jackson
 So Far (Crosby, Stills, Nash & Young album), 1974
 So Far (Sharon O'Neill album), 1984
 So Far (Dragon album), 1988
 So Far, a 2006 compilation album by Martin Solveig
 So Far, a 1972 album by Cochise
 So Far, a 1997 compilation album by Eileen Ivers
 So Far, a 2001 EP by Tony Lucca
 So Far... The Best Of, a 1997 compilation album by Sinéad O'Connor
 So Far: The Acoustic Sessions, a 2008 album by Bethany Dillon
 Faust So Far, a 1972 album by Faust (often referred to as So Far)

Songs
 "So Far..." a song by Eminem from MMLP2, 2013
 "So Far", a 1947 show tune from the Rodgers and Hammerstein musical Allegro
 "So Far", a song by Faust from their 1972 album Faust So Far
 "So Far", a 1992 song by The Heart Throbs

See also 
 So Far Away (disambiguation)
 "Life's Been Good", a 1978 Joe Walsh song with the lyric "Life's been good to me so far" (also sampled on the Eminem song)